William Edward Higgins (December 4, 1859 – April 25, 1919) was a professional baseball player. He played two seasons in Major League Baseball, with the Boston Beaneaters of the National League in 1888, and the St. Louis Browns and Syracuse Stars of the American Association in 1890, primarily as a second baseman. He was playing in the minor leagues as late as 1896.

External links

Major League Baseball second basemen
Boston Beaneaters players
St. Louis Browns (AA) players
Syracuse Stars (AA) players
Wilmington Quicksteps (minor league) players
Trenton (minor league baseball) players
Lancaster Ironsides players
Richmond Virginians (minor league) players
Waterbury Brassmen players
Lowell Magicians players
Detroit Wolverines (minor league) players
Syracuse Stars (minor league baseball) players
Providence Clamdiggers (baseball) players
Lowell Lowells players
Utica Stars players
Reading Actives players
Wilkes-Barre Coal Barons players
Memphis Fever Germs players
Scranton Indians players
Shenandoah Huns players
York White Roses players
Baseball players from Delaware
19th-century baseball players
1859 births
1919 deaths
People from Camden, Delaware